Kurt Lindeman (born 1 January 1932) is a Finnish épée and foil fencer and modern pentathlete. He competed at the 1952 and 1960 Summer Olympics.

References

External links
 

1932 births
Living people
Swedish-speaking Finns
Finnish male foil fencers
Finnish male modern pentathletes
Olympic fencers of Finland
Olympic modern pentathletes of Finland
Fencers at the 1952 Summer Olympics
Fencers at the 1960 Summer Olympics
Modern pentathletes at the 1960 Summer Olympics
Sportspeople from Helsinki
Finnish male épée fencers